Pál Vásárhelyi (18 June 1938 – 14 September 2008) was a Hungarian competitive ice dancer. With Györgyi Korda, he was the 1964 Winter Universiade champion, the 1964 Blue Swords champion, and a seven-time Hungarian national champion. The duo competed at four World and six European Championships. They placed among the European top five in 1963 (Budapest, Hungary), 1964 (Grenoble, France), and 1965 (Moscow, Soviet Union).

Vásárhelyi skated at Budapesti Lokomotív and Budapesti Spartacus. He retired from competition in 1965. He later worked as a library director at the Budapest University of Technology and Economics.

Competitive highlights 
With Korda

References 

1938 births
2008 deaths
Hungarian male ice dancers
Figure skaters from Budapest
Universiade medalists in figure skating
Universiade gold medalists for Hungary
Competitors at the 1964 Winter Universiade
20th-century Hungarian people
21st-century Hungarian people